Chris Cottrell is the founder of The Reading Initiative, and the student who wrote Chris's Law: Victim's Protection Act.

Chris' Law 
At the age of twelve, Cottrell wrote an idea for legislation as part of a homework project for a student legislature that was discovered and introduced by then-Senator Dean Martin. "Chris' Law," along with an amendment to the Arizona Constitution, keeps alleged sexual offenders from posting bail and established the first boundary around Arizona schools so convicted sexual offenders could not live in proximity of schools.

The bill was introduced to the Arizona State Senate in 2002 by Senator Dean Martin as "Chris' Law - Victim's Protection Act". It passed the Judiciary Committee and the Senate in March 2002. The Arizona House of Representatives also voted in favor of the bill a month later and it was signed into law by Governor Jane Dee Hull on May 17, 2002.

Proposition 103, the constitutional amendment accompanying the bill, was on the Arizona ballot in November, 2002 and passed with 80.4% of the vote, one of the most popular ballot measures in Arizona history.

Military service
While still a student at Georgetown, Cottrell joined the U.S. Army Reserve. After graduation, he completed basic training and commissioned from Officer Candidate School as an  intelligence officer. He later completed a ten-month deployment to Iraq with U.S. Special Operations Command in support of Operation Inherent Resolve.

References

1988 births
Living people
Arizona State University alumni
People from Tempe, Arizona
McDonough School of Business alumni